Penthides anilis is a species of beetle in the family Cerambycidae. It was described by Holzschuh in 2010.

References

Desmiphorini
Beetles described in 2010